¡Quiero Vivir! (I Want to Live!) is the debut album by Lilian Garcia, who is better known as the ring announcer for WWE Monday Night Raw. It was released in North America on Oct. 9, 2007 through Universal Music Latino.

Garcia co-wrote 11 songs on the album, including three with Jon Secada, whom she duets with on "Adonde". The album was produced by George Noriega (Ricky Martin, Jon Secada and Gloria Estefan) and Tim Mitchell (Shakira). The album contains 10 Spanish language tracks, and two English translations; "Under in Love" ("Desenamorada") and "Where Did Love Go?" ("Adonde").

As of October 14, 2007, the CD sold 3,800 units in its first week in the US alone. It made the top 250 in the US & the top 100 in the UK.

Track listing

References

Lilian Garcia albums
2007 debut albums
Spanish-language albums
Universal Music Latino albums
Warner Music Group albums
WWE albums